Louis Johannes Koen (born 28 March 1967) is a former South African cricketer who played five One Day Internationals from 1997 to 2000. In February 2020, he was named in South Africa's squad for the Over-50s Cricket World Cup in South Africa. However, the tournament was cancelled during the third round of matches due to the coronavirus pandemic.

References

External links
 

1967 births
Living people
South African cricketers
South Africa One Day International cricketers
Boland cricketers
Eastern Province cricketers